The Platte County Courthouse, at 800 9th Street in Wheatland, Wyoming, was built in 1917–18.  It was listed on the National Register of Historic Places in 2008.  It is Classical Revival in style. Designed by the Baerresen Brothers architects, it is a two-story buff-colored brick and concrete building.  Its west-facing facade is pedimented.

In 2018 it hosts the Circuit Court of the Eighth Judicial District.

References

External links
 Platte County Courthouse at the Wyoming State Historic Preservation Office

		
National Register of Historic Places in Platte County, Wyoming
Neoclassical architecture in Wyoming
Buildings and structures completed in 1918
Courthouses in Wyoming